This is a subarticle to Muslim, artists and Islamic art.

A Muslim painter is a Muslim that is or was engaged in painting or drawing. This is an incomplete list of notable Muslim painters.

 Abed Abdi (born 1942), Palestinian painter
 Affandi (1907-1990), Indonesian painter
 İsmail Acar (born 1971), Turkish painter
 Lubna Agha (1942-2012), Pakistan-born American painter
 Shakir Ali (1916-1975), Pakistani painter and lecturer
 Abdur Rahman Chughtai (1894-1975), Pakistani painter and intellectual
 Ismail Gulgee (1926-2007), Pakistani painter
 M. F. Husain (1915-2011), Indian painter
 Kartika Affandi (born 1934), Indonesian painter, daughter of Affandi
 Hédi Khayachi (1882-1948), Tunisian painter
 Tyeb Mehta (1925-2009), Indian painter
 Mochtar Apin (1932-1994), Indonesian painter and lecturer
 Sughra Rababi (1922-1994), Pakistani painter
 Sadequain (1923-1987), Pakistani painter and poet
 SM Sultan (1923–1994), Bengali painter
 Umi Dachlan (1942-2009), Indonesian painter and lecturer
 Zainul Abedin (1914-1976), Bangladeshi painter

References

See also

 Lists of Muslims
 Lists of painters

Painters
Muslim